Thomas Matton (born 24 October 1985) is a Belgian former professional footballer who played as an attacking midfielder.

Career
Matton got his youth training mainly at Club Brugge. He was a member of the generation of players such as Jason Vandelannoite, Glenn Verbauwhede and Nicolas Lombaerts. In 2006, he entered the first team of Club Brugge, but did not play any games.

On 21 May 2007, Matton signed a two-year contract at OH Leuven. At the end of April 2008, he signed a contract of four seasons at S.V. Zulte Waregem. In May 2012, he signed a two-year contract at Kortrijk.

On 10 February 2015, it was announced that Matton was transferred to Gent after Kortrijk had not been willing to prolong the contract of Matton. He signed in Gent for two years.

Matton finally announced his retirement on 8 December 2017 after successive injuries.

References

External links
 
 

Living people
1985 births
Association football midfielders
Belgian footballers
Oud-Heverlee Leuven players
S.V. Zulte Waregem players
K.V. Kortrijk players
K.A.A. Gent players
Belgian Pro League players
Challenger Pro League players